Óscar Javier Tabuenka Berges (born 24 April 1971 in Bilbao, Basque Country) is a Spanish retired footballer who played as a central defender, and a coach.

External links

1971 births
Living people
Spanish footballers
Footballers from Bilbao
Association football defenders
La Liga players
Segunda División players
Segunda División B players
Bilbao Athletic footballers
Athletic Bilbao footballers
SD Compostela footballers
Granada CF footballers
Spain under-21 international footballers
Spain under-23 international footballers
Spanish football managers
CD Aurrerá de Vitoria footballers